The term feeble-minded was used from the late 19th century in Europe, the United States and Australasia for disorders later referred to as illnesses or deficiencies of the mind.

At the time, mental deficiency encompassed all degrees of educational and social deficiency. Within the concept of mental deficiency, researchers established a hierarchy, ranging from idiocy, at the most severe end of the scale; to imbecility, at the median point; and to feeble-mindedness at the highest end of functioning. The last was conceived of as a form of high-grade mental deficiency.

The development of the ranking system of mental deficiency has been attributed to Sir Charles Trevelyan in 1876, and was associated with the rise of eugenics. The term and hierarchy had been used in that sense at least 10 years previously.  "Wild card" terms outside the established hierarchy such as idiot savant, may have been used as connotations for varying degrees of autism.

History
The earliest recorded use of the term in the English language dates from 1534, when it appears in one of the first English translations of the New Testament, the Tyndale Bible.  A biblical commandment to "Comforte the feble mynded" is included in 1 Thessalonians.

A London Times editorial of November 1834 describes the long-serving former Prime Minister Lord Liverpool as a "feeble-minded pedant of office".

Definition
The British government's Royal Commission on the Care and Control of the Feeble-Minded (1904–1908), in its Report in 1908 defined the feeble-minded as:

Despite being pejorative, in its day the term was considered, along with idiot, imbecile, and moron, to be a relatively precise psychiatric classification.

The American psychologist Henry H. Goddard, who coined the term moron, was the director of the Vineland Training School (originally the Vineland Training School for Backward and Feeble-minded Children) at Vineland, New Jersey. Goddard was known for strongly postulating that "feeble-mindedness" was a hereditary trait, most likely caused by a single recessive gene. Goddard rang the eugenic "alarm bells" in his 1912 work, The Kallikak Family: A Study in the Heredity of Feeble-Mindedness, about those in the population who carried the recessive trait despite outward appearances of normality.

In the first half of the 20th century, a diagnosis of "feeble-mindedness, in any of its grades" was a common criterion for many states in the United States, which embraced eugenics as a progressive measure, to mandate the compulsory sterilization of such patients. In the 1927 US Supreme Court case Buck v. Bell, Justice Oliver Wendell Holmes closed the 8–1 majority opinion upholding the sterilization of Carrie Buck, with the phrase, "Three generations of imbeciles are enough." Buck, her mother and daughter were all classified as feeble-minded.

Representation in other media
Jack London published a short story, "Told in the Drooling Ward" (1914), which describes inmates at a California institution for the "feeble-minded".  He narrates the story from the point of view of a self-styled "high-grade feeb".  The California Home for the Care and Training of Feeble-minded Children, later the Sonoma Developmental Center, was located near the Jack London Ranch in Glen Ellen, California.

See also
 Insanity
 Developmental disorder

References

External links

 , contains the story "Told in the Drooling Ward".

Obsolete terms for mental disorders
Intellectual disability
Slurs related to low intelligence
Pejorative terms for people with disabilities